Fernie is a Scottish surname. Fernie can refer to:

Places
Fernie, British Columbia, a city in British Columbia, Canada
Mount Fernie, a mountain in the Canadian Rockies of British Columbia, Canada
Mount Fernie Provincial Park, a park on Mount Fernie
Fernie Alpine Resort, a ski resort in the Canadian Rockies of British Columbia, Canada
Fernie (electoral district), a provincial electoral district in British Columbia, Canada
Fernie Castle, a sixteenth-century tower house in north-east Fife, Scotland

People
Fernie Flaman, a Canadian professional ice hockey player
Duncan Fernie (b. 1978), a Scottish curler
Jim Fernie (b. 1936), a Scottish footballer
Willie Fernie (golfer), a Scottish golfer
Willie Fernie (footballer), a Scottish footballer

See also
Fernando